Solitude is the fourth studio album by King Midas Sound, the musical project of British musicians Kevin Martin and Roger Robinson. It was released on 15 February (Valentine's Day) 2019 through Cosmo Rhythmatic.

The album is almost entirely beatless, and the lyrics explore isolation, loneliness, regret and resentment. According to Martin and Robinson, it was recorded in a fraught period, but the lyrics are not autobiographical.

Track listing

Reception
While the album was largely met with positive reviews, reviewers have found the album difficult to recommend due to the overwhelming bleakness of it. Theo Korz for The Line of Best Fit wrote that "Solitude is not an easy record to enjoy – even in writing this review I was reluctant to return to it", but that the album was "brilliant and awful", while Louis Pattison for Pitchfork wrote that "Solitude is the sort of record it's hard to recommend wholeheartedly", saying it's "too severe, too unrelenting".

References

2019 albums
Kevin Martin (British musician) albums